Ivica Avramović (born 30 August 1976) is a Serbian former footballer who played as a midfielder.

References

1976 births
Living people
Footballers from Belgrade
Serbia and Montenegro footballers
Serbian footballers
Association football midfielders
Hamburger SV II players
FK Železnik players
FK Sutjeska Nikšić players
OFK Mladenovac players
FK Borac Čačak players
Regionalliga players
First League of Serbia and Montenegro players
Second League of Serbia and Montenegro players
Serbia and Montenegro expatriate footballers
Expatriate footballers in Germany
Serbia and Montenegro expatriate sportspeople in Germany